Structural vulnerability is a distinct likelihood of encountering major difficulties within the family atmosphere or the threat to the family itself because of such deficient capital resources as money, education, access to health care, or important/vital information. 

Structural vulnerability is a threat to any low-income individual that must caretake for a family. Social workers described these individuals as people that "In the largest richest country in the world, they work full time year around and some work multiple jobs as well, but they still do not earn enough to support their families." Structural vulnerability is cited as a reason that migrant workers in the United States are more vulnerable to violence and public health risks such as HIV.

Health Issues
When Structural Vulnerability strikes the household poor children are more likely than their affluent peers to encounter a lengthy list of health problems. Potential health Issues include inadequate prenatal care, Low birth weight, iron deficiency, and a high risk exposure to toxic metals like lead. 

Hunger and Malnutrition can lead to more health issues concerning low income families. Issues could include elevated heart rates, diabetes, hypertension, cancer, asthma, and dental problems. Low income families are less likely to have health insurance, with little or no health insurance lower income families are subject to prolong illnesses.

References

Social inequality